Kenneth Eastham (born 11 August 1927) is a British former Labour politician.

Early life
Eastham was born the son of the late James Eastham. He was a planning engineer for GEC at Trafford Park, Manchester.

Political career 
Eastham was a councillor in Manchester for eighteen years. He represented the Beswick area in the City of Manchester for the duration of his local government career, and was first elected as a councillor for the Beswick ward on the county borough in 1963. Following the Local Government Act 1972, he continued to represent the Beswick ward on the new Manchester City Council metropolitan borough, being elected at the inaugural Manchester City Council elections in 1973. Eastham was Chairman of the Planning Committee (from 1971 to 1974) and the Education Committee (from 1978 to 1979). He was Deputy Leader of the Council from 1975 to 1979, and in the same period, a member of the North West Economic Planning Council.

Beswick, which had been in the Manchester Exchange parliamentary seat, became part of the newly-created Manchester Central constituency, but already had a sitting MP. Eastham was thus instead selected for the neighbouring Manchester Blackley. At the 1979 general election, on the same day that he was first elected to the House of Commons as a Member of Parliament, Eastham was re-elected in the Manchester City Council election. At the general election, however, Labour lost power to the Conservatives. Eastham stood down as a councillor at the 1982 local elections.

From 1987 to 1992, Eastham was an Opposition Whip. He remained the MP for Manchester Blackley until his retirement at the 1997 general election, which coincided with the same period in which Labour were out of office nationally. Eastham thus spent his entire career in Parliament in opposition.

Personal life
In 1951, he married Doris, the daughter of Albert Howarth. The couple had a daughter. He lives in Wythenshawe, south Manchester.

References

"Times Guide to the House of Commons", Times Newspapers Limited, 1992 and 1997 editions.

1927 births
Living people
Amalgamated Engineering Union-sponsored MPs
Labour Party (UK) MPs for English constituencies
UK MPs 1983–1987
UK MPs 1979–1983
UK MPs 1987–1992
UK MPs 1992–1997